The Manasir (singular Mansuri) is a tribe of the United Arab Emirates (UAE). Nomadic, warlike and fiercely independent, they roamed between Buraimi and Qatar, the Persian Gulf coast to Liwa and also settled in the Northern emirates. They subsisted through date farming, pearling and moving goods with their camel trains, as well as camel breeding.

Independent Bedouin 
One of the most important tribes in the emirate of Abu Dhabi (together with the Bani Yas, with whom they cooperated and coexisted closely), the tribe was traditionally predominant in the desert areas between Buraimi and Qatar and the Persian Gulf coast to Liwa, but Manasir families had settled Abu Dhabi, Buraimi, Al Khan and Jumeirah by the turn of the 20th century. Apart from the settled population in the towns, the Manasir were entirely nomadic Bedouin, while the tribe they shared this region with, the Bani Yas, was largely settled. There were also a number of nomadic Marar families in the Liwa region.

Manasir houses in the Liwa Crescent were mostly seasonal areesh, or palm frond constructions, maintained as dwellings during the summer date season.

Some 1,400 Manasir roamed this tribal area or dar at the turn of the century, but surveys in the 1950s point to a total population of some 4,000: 2,800 of these lived in the emirate of Abu Dhabi while the balance lived both settled and nomadic lives in the other Trucial States.

The Manasir were fiercely independent and, unlike their settled counterparts the Bani Yas, did not necessarily consider themselves dependents of the Sheikh of Abu Dhabi. They did co-operate closely with the Bani Yas, however, and of 42 settlements in the Liwa area, Manasir were found in 36. They were an inland people with limited maritime resources and had few boats of their own. They worked the pearl banks with the Bani Yas, or worked as divers or haulers for various nakhudas. During the date season, Manasir who did not own their own plantations would work on settled plantations for payment in kind. The Manasir were exempted from paying the customary date tax to the Ruler of Abu Dhabi.

Decline in revenues 
Subsections of the tribe include the Al Bu Mundir (Kaabara, Mani, Marashid, Matawaah, Midahima); Al Bu Rahamah (Al Bu Khail, Tarsif, Tararifah and Wabran) and the Al Bu Shaar (Ghawainam, Rashaiyid and Al Bu Thuwaibit), and Al Rabeea. All of these wintered to the North West (by the border with Qatar) and summered in Liwa, although the Al Bu Khail section of the Al Bu Rahamah wintered in Semeih and Abu Dhabi and summered in Buraimi.

Formerly subject to the Wahhabi government, they had asserted their independence by the turn of the 20th century and were closer to Abu Dhabi, but remained essentially independent, with their own sheikhs.

The Manasir bred camels and also carried trade goods from the oases to Abu Dhabi. They made their own charcoal and would carry this, dates, limes, wheat and other produce from the oases to the towns. The annual seasonal migration of families from Abu Dhabi took place to the oases of the interior (both Al Ain, then known as Buraimi and Liwa) for the hot summer months and the date season – and the Manasir would be hired to provide the camel trains.

As the revenues of the pearl trade declined in the late 1920s, the Manasir's trade in breeding and hiring camels for the carrying trade suffered and an increase in Manasir raids on the communities of the Northern emirates resulted. This led to the respective rulers of Abu Dhabi being pressed for reparations by other Trucial Sheikhs as their own dependents took their claims to the majlis to be settled.

Alternative sources of revenue 
An alternative source of revenue for the Manasir was working for the oil companies: ARAMCO or Qatar Petroleum (today QatarEnergy). Petroleum Development (Trucial Coast) Ltd had 40 Manasir on its payroll, but they only took work for as long as it took to pay off their immediate economic need, a date garden or perhaps a new wife. Latterly, it would be a Land Rover. Their animals would be left with a relative while they took up this temporary work. As this pattern of working for oil companies turned into longer term employment, and the Buraimi Dispute began to show how tribal affiliations could turn into territorial claims, the government of Abu Dhabi started to regulate this movement of labour and Manasir who stayed away longer than a year were liable to find their date plantations confiscated.

Another source of revenue as the march of civilisation forced changes to their way of life was to work as a retainer for the Ruler of Abu Dhabi. The Sheikhs of Abu Dhabi in their turn recognised that the Manasir was a potent and influential force and ensured that employment opportunities were open and subsidies paid to the Sheikhs of the Manasir. In the 1950s, the Ruler of Abu Dhabi had 85 regularly paid Manasir retainers.

Conflicts 
The Manasir frequently formed an important part of Abu Dhabi's fighting force, and always fought alongside the Bani Yas. When Sheikh Saeed bin Tahnun Al Nahyan repelled the Wahhabis from the Buraimi Oasis in 1848 with most of his forces consist with Awamir tribe, it was the Manasir, together with the Mazari, who waited South of Abu Dhabi to fall on the relieving force send from Nejd under Saad bin Mutlaq. They were fighting again in Buraimi in 1923, when the Manasir played a key role in fighting against the Duru, Bani Qitab and Awamir in Buraimi – a conflict that was to lead to a long period of inter-tribal skirmishing and raiding throughout the interior.

However, they were also a force to be reckoned with and willing to play king-maker: in 1928 Sheikh Saqr bin Zayed Al Nahyan was shot and killed by a group of Al Balushi and Manasir, paving the way for the rule of Sheikh Shakbut bin Sultan Al Nahyan, and again in 1927, when Sheikh Sultan bin Saqr Al Qasimi of Sharjah expelled Sheikh Khalid bin Ahmad Al Qasimi with the help of the Manasir.

Notable members
Mariam Al Mansouri – The first female fighter pilot of the United Arab Emirates
Hazza Al Mansouri – The first Emirati astronaut in space

References 

Tribes of the United Arab Emirates
History of the United Arab Emirates